The Cocoș is a small river in Constanța County, Romania. It discharges into the northern branch of the Danube–Black Sea Canal in Poarta Albă.

References

Rivers of Constanța County
Rivers of Romania